Alexandre di Gregorio (born 12 February 1980) is a Belgian football striker who currently plays for RFC Tilleur SG, for the 2015–2016 season. He also played for RKC Waalwijk.

References

1980 births
Living people
Belgian footballers
K.R.C. Genk players
RKC Waalwijk players
R. Charleroi S.C. players
Belgian expatriate footballers
Expatriate footballers in the Netherlands
Belgian expatriate sportspeople in the Netherlands
Belgian people of Italian descent
Belgian Pro League players
Challenger Pro League players
Eredivisie players
Eerste Divisie players
Association football forwards